Tony Crunk is an American poet whose first volume of poetry, Living in the Resurrection, won the Yale Series of Younger Poets Competition.

Biography
Crunk was born in Hopkinsville, Kentucky. He received his B.A. at Centre College, an M.A. in philosophy at University of Kentucky, and an M.A. in literature and M.F.A. in creative writing from the University of Virginia.

Crunk has taught at the University of Virginia, James Madison University, Murray State University (Kentucky), the University of Montana, Samford University, and University of Alabama Birmingham, where he administers the Alabama Writers’ Forum. In 1997, he was awarded one of eight Writer's Community Residence Awards. In 2008, Crunk was chosen to represent Kentucky at the Library of Congress Poetry at Noon series.

Work
In 1994, his first collection of poetry, Living in the Resurrection, published in 1995, won that year's Yale Series of Younger Poets Competition. In the foreword, James Dickey noted that these poems spoke of a "quest" for a spiritual home, which Dickey located in the American South, the art being that of "Southern gospel music and homiletics." The theme of an odyssey is echoed by critic Steve Harris. In a lengthy review of Crunk's work, critic Vincent King states that Dickey's conception of Crunk's art is a misreading (perhaps caused by Dickey's failing health in 1994), and that rather the tension between Crunk's Christian heritage and his rejection of his Southern Baptism is the key to the interpretation of the poems.

Crunk's 2010 New Covenant Bound is a collection of poems inspired by the displacement between 1935 and 1969 of some 20,000 inhabitants in order to create the Land Between the Lakes (then known as Land Between the Rivers) between the Cumberland and Tennessee rivers in western Kentucky and Tennessee.

Works

Poetry

Children's books

Criticism
 Reuben; The Legend of Caty Sage, Alabama Writers' Forum

References

External references
Celebrating Kentucky Poets, Library of Congress webcasts, 18 November 2008

Living people
American male poets
Centre College alumni
James Madison University faculty
Murray State University faculty
Writers from Montgomery, Alabama
University of Kentucky alumni
University of Virginia alumni
University of Virginia faculty
University of Montana faculty
Yale Younger Poets winners
20th-century American poets
21st-century American poets
Poets from Kentucky
Poets from Alabama
20th-century American male writers
21st-century American male writers
Year of birth missing (living people)